Adrian Francis Rollini (June 28, 1903 – May 15, 1956) was an American jazz multi-instrumentalist who played the bass saxophone, piano, vibraphone, and many other instruments. Rollini is also known for introducing the goofus, a free-reed instrument resembling a saxophone, in jazz music. As a leader, his major recordings included "You've Got Everything" (1933), "Savage Serenade" (1933) and "Got The Jitters" (1934) on Banner, Perfect, Melotone, Romeo, Oriole, "A Thousand Good Nights" (1934) on Vocalion, "Davenport Blues" (1934) on Decca, "Nothing But Notes", "Tap Room Swing", "Jitters", "Riverboat Shuffle" (1934) on Decca, and "Small Fry" (1938) on Columbia.

Early life
Rollini was born in New York City on June 28, 1903 of French and Swiss extraction to Ferdinand Rollini and Adele (née Augenti) Rollini. The original family name had been changed to "Rollini" by his grandfather, after a move to Italy during one of Europe's many wars. (Some sources will date 1904, but his brother Arthur Rollini, as well as Social Security Administration records, cite the earlier year.) Arthur Rollini played tenor saxophone with Benny Goodman from 1934 to 1939 (and later with Will Bradley). Growing up in Larchmont, New York, Adrian showed musical ability early on and began to take piano lessons on a miniature piano, at the age of two. At the age of four, he played a fifteen-minute recital at the Waldorf Astoria Hotel. Among the selections played were Chopin's Minute Waltz—he was hailed as a child prodigy and was billed as "Professor Adrian Rollini".

Rollini continued with music and, by age 14, he was leading his group composed of neighborhood boys, in which he doubled on piano and xylophone.

Rollini left high school in his third year. He cut piano rolls for the Aeolian company on their Mel-O-Dee label and the Republic brand in Philadelphia. When he was 16, he joined Arthur Hand's California Ramblers. Rollini was equally skilled at piano, drums, xylophone, and bass saxophone, which gained him the respect of Hand, who transferred the band to Rollini when he later retired from the music field. According to Arthur Rollini's book, Thirty Years with the Big Bands, Adrian mastered the bass saxophone in a matter of weeks.

Career

He cut many sides under the California Ramblers and formed two subgroups – the Little Ramblers (starting in 1924) and the Goofus Five (most prominently 1926–27). It was during his work with these groups that he developed his distinctive style of saxophone playing. Rollini's swing and impetus are quite evident; "Clementine (From New Orleans)", "Vo-Do-Do-De-O Blues", and "And Then I Forget" are among some of the best recordings that not only typify the era but showcase the prominence and power that Rollini brought to the table. During this time, he managed to lay down hundreds of sessions with names like Annette Hanshaw, Cliff Edwards (Ukulele Ike), Joe Venuti, Miff Mole, and Red Nichols to name a few. Some of his best work appears on the sides he cut with Bix Beiderbecke (scattered throughout the 1920s, Rollini's great bass sax solos were on scores of records, and were usually outstanding). He also recorded and worked with Roger Wolfe Kahn, Frank Trumbauer, and Red Nichols.

In 1927, not only did he participate in numerous recording sessions, but he also gained the job of heading up the talent roster for the opening of the Club New Yorker. It was a short-lived organization, a who's-who of 1920s jazz, including Bix Beiderbecke, Eddie Lang, Joe Venuti, Frank Signorelli and Frank Trumbauer. Salary demands began to rise, and the club had its shortcomings, which proved a bad combination in the end, and the arrangement only lasted for some 3 weeks. It was not long until other talents would be seeking his name. From across the Atlantic, Fred Elizalde, a young London-based band leader was leading a band at the Savoy Hotel, and he was looking for the best American jazzmen to spice up his already hot sound. He found Rollini, as well as Chelsea Quealey, Bobby Davis, Tommy Felline and Jack Russin. Rollini submitted his resignation to the Ramblers (where he was replaced by bass saxist Spencer Clark and later by bassist-tubist Ward Lay), and agreed to join Elizalde, along with fellow Ramblers Quealey, Felline, Russin, and (later) Davis, in 1927, and stayed until September 1928. Once he returned to America he also began to write, working with Robbins Music Corporation—some of his compositions would include "Preparation", "On Edge", "Nonchalance", "Lightly and Politely", "Gliding Ghost", and "Au Revoir".

He continued to work, recording with such artists as Bert Lown, Lee Morse, The Dorsey Brothers, Ben Selvin and Jack Teagarden into the depression of the 30s. However, the early 30s saw a shift in musical ideas—away from the "hot", two-beat feel and towards a more staid, conservative sound, and Rollini adapted. In 1932–33 he was part of a short-lived experiment with the Bert Lown band using two bass saxophones, Spencer Clark in the rhythm section and Rollini himself as the fourth sax in the reed team.

In 1933, he formed the Adrian Rollini Orchestra (a studio group assembled for recording), which appeared on Perfect, Vocalion, Melotone, Banner, and Romeo labels. While Rollini did manage to assemble some great talent (for example Bunny Berigan, Benny Goodman and Jack Teagarden), these records were more commercial in comparison to his earlier work. Several examples have solo work and proto-swing elements, but on the whole the records were meant to sell current pop tunes. (Several sides have Rollini on bass sax only to switch to vibraphone during the song.) At this time Rollini also appeared as a vibra aphonist with Richard Himber's radio orchestra, playing a strictly secondary role in the large, string-oriented ensemble.

His other groups would include the Adrian Rollini Quintette, The Adrian Rollini Trio (primarily late 1930s), and Adrian and his Tap Room Gang based in the Hotel President at 234 West 48th Street in New York City. He managed Adrian's Tap Room, inside the hotel during the early swing era starting in 1935, as well as leading the small band of 6–8 players. He had the Whitby Grill on West 45th Street. Both of these were indicative of his inseparability from his professional and social life. His clientele in each club was for the most part musicians on a holiday. Rollini could be found on the radio working with artists like Kate Smith. As if he didn't have enough going for him he turned once again to another phase of his musical venture and opened a store for the sale and repair of musical instruments, known as White Way Musical Products which was located at 1587 Broadway. It had long been his belief that the artist playing the instrument knows more about it than the maker concerned only with the mechanics. The shop was a hot spot for autograph hounds who trolled the shop in search of famous band leaders. He was also making excursions between the Georgian Room and the Piccadilly Circus Bar, both in the Piccadilly Hotel. He also began recording for Master and Muzak.

During this time, a gradual shift occurred in Rollini's focus from the bass sax to the vibraphone. This was not so much that Rollini was giving up on the bass saxophone or his abilities, but popular tastes had rendered the instrument unmarketable after the hot jazz era of the 1920s. Rollini recorded on bass sax for the last time in 1938. He continued to be active with vibraphone and chimes, but when he gave up his role as a bass saxophonist, his role in jazz went with it.

He went on to play hotels, as well as arranging and writing songs behind the scenes, collaborating with such names as Vaughan Monroe. However, once the big band era got underway he didn't make any major recordings and this period in his life represents the last of his work with the exception of some minor appearance and jam sessions. He can be seen in the 1938 short entitled "Auld Lang Syne", starring James Cagney, and "Melody Masters: Swing Style" (1939). He also did a brief tour in the late 1940s in which he came to the Majestic Theater in downtown Dallas, among other cities.

In his spare time, Rollini considered himself a "waterbug," and was proud of it. He owned a 21-foot Chris Craft speedboat and a Chris Craft cruiser, sleeping four. After an exhaustive career, he made his last recording with his trio in the early 1950s and then turned his attention fully to the hotel business. He later relocated to Florida and opened the Eden Roc Hotel in September 1955. He also ran the Driftwood Inn at Tavernier Key. Rollini loved sport-fishing, and his Driftwood offered deep-sea fishing charters. After Rollini's death, it appears his wife Dixie left Florida. The remains of the old Driftwood Inn were completely destroyed in a hurricane that rocked the Florida Keys in 1960.

Death
He died May 15, 1956, aged 52. Jazz discographer Brian Rust presented a memorial program in the BBC Light Programme's World of Jazz on June 8. For some time Rollini's cause of death was something of a mystery. A brief article in England's Melody Maker, says Adrian's brother, Arthur Rollini was "trying to solve the mystery surrounding Adrian's death. He was sent to the hospital following a severe trauma to his ankle (apparently from an auto-related accident in the parking lot of the Green Turtle Inn at the Islamorada Key)." According to the Melody Maker he was found lying in a blood-splattered car, and one of his feet was almost severed. The article also says he died of a heart attack and lung collapse. The hospital he was sent to was the James Archer Smith Hospital in Homestead, Florida.

He died after an 18-day stay in the hospital. According to the book Jazz and Death: Medical Profiles of Jazz Greats (2002), the author, M.D. Frederick J. Spencer (also a coroner), went back and analyzed Rollini's death along with many other jazz greats, and discovered Rollini died of mercury poisoning. During his 18-day stay he had developed a resistance to feeding, so a glass tube had been inserted into his stomach. The tube was weighted with mercury and somehow the tube broke, exposing Rollini to mercury poisoning. In an alternate account, Rollini's acquaintance, clarinetist Kenny Davern, stated in a 2001 video interview that Rollini was found murdered in a mob-related hit, a result of his gambling debts. He was survived by his wife, Dorothy ("Dixie") Rollini. In 1998, Adrian Rollini was inducted into the Big Band and Jazz Hall of Fame.

Discography
Adrian Rollini: Bouncin' in Rhythm, (Pavilion, 1995)
The Goofus Five, (Timeless, 1998)
Tap Room Swing, (ASV Living Era, 2002)
Adrian Rollini 1929–34, (Jazz Oracle, 2005)
Adrian Rollini and the Golden Gate Orchestra 1924–1927: Their Hottest Titles Recorded for the Pathé and Plaza Labels, (Timeless, 2006)
Adrian Rollini 1934–1938, (Retrieval, 2004)
Adrian Rollini 1937–1938, (Retrieval, 2005)
Adrian Rollini Trio, Quartet and Quintet, (Vintage Music, 2005)
Adrian Rollini as a Sideman, Volume 1: 1929–1933, (Jazz Oracle, 2006)

References

Bibliography
 Adrian Rollini: The Life and Music of a Jazz Rambler, University Press of Mississippi, 2019,

External links

Red Hot Jazz
John Altman
Harry Francis
Bass Sax.com

1903 births
1956 deaths
American jazz bandleaders
American jazz bass saxophonists
American male saxophonists
American people of Italian descent
Dixieland saxophonists
20th-century American saxophonists
20th-century American male musicians
American male jazz musicians
The Dorsey Brothers members
The California Ramblers members
American jazz vibraphonists